Länsi-Pakila (Finnish), Västra Baggböle (Swedish) is a neighbourhood in Northern Helsinki, about nine kilometers from the city center. Länsi-Pakila has approximately 6 874 inhabitants (1.1.2014).

In Länsi-Pakila the average size of the apartments is the second largest in Helsinki, 98 m2.

Since the 1970s, the largest party in Länsi-Pakila has been Coalition. The National Coalition Party was the most popular party in Länsi-Pakila in the 2012 municipal elections (50% support) and in the 2015 parliamentary elections (44% support).

Notable people
Antero Vartia
Arto Bryggare
Erkki Junkkarinen
Jimi Constantine
Kari Hotakainen
Martti Larni
Oskari Mörö
Signmark

References

Neighbourhoods of Helsinki